The Glasgow Orpheus Choir was founded in Glasgow, Scotland in 1906 by Hugh S. Roberton.

It originated in the Toynbee Musical Association, which had been created in 1901. The Glasgow Orpheus Choir came to be considered without peer in Britain, and it toured widely enjoying world acclaim. Roberton expected the highest standards of performance from its members. Its voice was a choir voice, its individual voices not tolerated. He set new standards in choral technique and interpretation.

Their repertoire included many Scottish folk songs arranged for choral performance, and paraphrases, as well as Italian madrigals, English motets and the music of the Russian Orthodox Church. The choir also performed the works of Johann Sebastian Bach, George Frideric Handel, Felix Mendelssohn, Peter Cornelius, Johannes Brahms and others.

Roberton was knighted in the 1931 New Year's Honours.  The choir disbanded in 1951 on his  retirement, but was immediately replaced by the Glasgow Phoenix Choir, led by Peter Mooney.

References

Scottish choirs
1901 establishments in Scotland
1951 disestablishments in Scotland
Musical groups from Glasgow